The Long Trail is a 1917 American drama silent film directed by Howell Hansel and written by Eve Unsell. The film stars Lou Tellegen, Mary Fuller, Winifred Allen, Sidney Bracey, Franklin Woodruff and Ferdinand Tidmarsh. The film was released on July 23, 1917, by Paramount Pictures.

Plot
The plot description in the 11 August 1917 issue of Moving Picture World reads:

Cast 
Lou Tellegen as Andre Dubois
Mary Fuller as Louise Graham
Winifred Allen as Michette Dubois
Sidney Bracey as Paul Graham 
Franklin Woodruff as Const. Joyce
Ferdinand Tidmarsh
Frank Farrington

References

External links 
 

1917 films
1910s English-language films
Silent American drama films
1917 drama films
Paramount Pictures films
American black-and-white films
American silent feature films
Films directed by Howell Hansel
1910s American films